Yang Yilin (born August 26, 1992) is a retired Chinese artistic gymnast. She was the 2008 Olympic all-around bronze medalist and a member of the gold medal winning Chinese Olympics gymnastics team. Yang was also the 2007 World Championships bronze medalist on the uneven bars.

Gymnastic career
Yang was born in Huadu, Guangzhou, Guangdong. In 2007, she was a member of the Chinese team for the World Championships. She won two medals: a silver with the Chinese team, and an individual bronze on the uneven bars. She also placed sixth in the all-around. Yang was also the all-around gold medalist at the 2007 Intercity Games, a national multi-sport event for teenagers aged 13 to 15 in China. In the spring of 2008, she led the Guangdong team to gold at the Chinese National Championships and claimed individual medals in the all-around, uneven bars, and floor exercise.

At the 2008 Olympic Games in Beijing, Yang won the bronze medal in the individual all-around final with a score of 62.650, a bronze in the uneven bars event final, and a gold in the team competition (contributing a 15.100 on vault and 16.800 on uneven bars). Yang's eligibility for the games was questioned based on age discrepancies.

In 2009 and 2010, Yang represented China at the World Championships. She won a bronze medal with the team in 2010.

Competitive history

Floor Music
 2007–2008   Bolero from Moulin Rouge Soundtrack
 2009        Zigeunerweisen by Pablo de Sarasate
 2010        Laguan Gitarra by Agua Loca

References

External links
 
 
 
 

1992 births
Living people
Chinese female artistic gymnasts
Gymnasts at the 2008 Summer Olympics
Olympic bronze medalists for China
Olympic gold medalists for China
Olympic gymnasts of China
People from Huadu District
Hakka sportspeople
Medalists at the World Artistic Gymnastics Championships
Olympic medalists in gymnastics
Medalists at the 2008 Summer Olympics
Asian Games medalists in gymnastics
Gymnasts at the 2010 Asian Games
Asian Games gold medalists for China
Medalists at the 2010 Asian Games
Gymnasts from Guangzhou